The Two Worlds of William March is a 1984 biography of William March, written by the British scholar, critic and author Roy S. Simmonds. William Butcher, reviewing the biography for World Literature Today, called it "a judicious record of March's life and a fine tribute to his literary achievement".

References

1984 non-fiction books
Biographies about writers
American biographies